The irregular bow-fingered gecko (Cyrtodactylus irregularis) is a species of lizard in the family Gekkonidae. The species is endemic to Vietnam.

Description
Dorsally, it is grayish-brown, with dark brown, white-edged, angular spots or crossbands. A curved band extends across the nape of the neck from eye to eye. Ventrally, it is whitish.

Reproduction
C. irregularis is oviparous.

References

Further reading
Nguyen, Van Sang; Ho, Thu Cuc; Nguyen, Quang Truong (2009). Herpetofauna of Vietnam. Frankfurt am Main: Edition Chimaira / Serpents Tale. 768 pp. .
Rösler, Herbert (2000). "Kommentierte Liste der rezent, subrezent und fossil bekannten Geckotaxa (Reptilia: Gekkonomorpha) ". Gekkota 2: 28–153. (Cyrtodactylus irregularis, new combination, p. 66). (in German).
Smith MA (1921). "New or Little-known Reptiles and Batrachians from Southern Annam (Indo-China)". Proceedings of the Zoological Society of London 1921: 423–440. (Gymnodactylus peguensis Var. irregularis, new variety, p. 428, Text-figure 1B).

Cyrtodactylus
Reptiles described in 1921